Board International S.A. is a Business Intelligence (BI) and Corporate Performance Management (CPM) software vendor known for its Board tool kit. The company was based in Chiasso, Switzerland, where it was founded in 1994, and Boston, Massachusetts.

Board International now operates in 19 countries, with around 3,000 customers from a number of variety of industries,

Products 
The firm offers one product, the Board toolkit. It combines various business intelligence (BI)  and corporate performance management (CPM) functions within a single graphical software environment. The BI capabilities include multi-dimensional analysis, ad hoc querying, dash-boarding and reporting, while the CPM capabilities include budgeting, planning and forecasting as well as "other finance-related activities." It does not require any programming skills to build  applications.

Technology 
As of version 7, the toolkit featured a service-oriented architecture that relied heavily on Microsoft technology, especially the .NET Framework with its Windows Communication Foundation. This allowed for a tight integration with other Microsoft products, such as Microsoft Office, but required Windows in order to run the full client, a limitation which has been identified by Gartner as a possible factor for preventing a deeper market penetration.

In 2012, the company introduced an update of its proprietary multidimensional database. This new technology was labelled as HBMP (Hybrid Bitwise Memory Pattern). It introduced a new compression method and combines disk-based and in-memory database approaches. It supports both relational and multidimensional data models.

As of version 11, the firm was a Niche Player in the 2018 Gartner Magic Quadrant. It is rated as one of only two vendors "offering a modern analytics and BI platform with integrated financial planning and reporting functionality", which works on premises as well as in the cloud. Its direct competitor is SAP with Analytics for Cloud.

Recognition 
In recent years, Board has been frequently included in major publications on the BI and CPM markets. The introduction of the .NET-based Board 7 earned the company a Microsoft. NET Swiss Innovation Award in 2010.

Offices 
The firm has a total of twenty-seven offices spread across five continents and nineteen countries, with headquarters  in Chiasso, Switzerland, and Boston, USA. The company recently opened three new offices in 2011 (China, Japan and Mexico). Board has fourteen offices in Europe, three offices in Australia, five in Asia, four in North America, and one in South America.

References

External links 
 BOARD International Website

Business intelligence companies
Software companies of Switzerland